The Toxocampina are a noctuid ("owlet") moth subtribe of the Catocalinae subfamily.

This taxon is part of the Catocalini tribe, the largest in their family, though the subtribe itself is not particularly genus-rich. As numerous catocaline genera have not yet been assigned to a tribe, the genus list should be considered preliminary.